Ovicide may refer to:

 Insecticides that are designed to kill eggs
 Infanticide (zoology), the destruction of eggs